Dante's Inferno is a 1924 American silent drama film directed by Henry Otto that was released by Fox Film Corporation and adapted from Inferno, part of Dante Alighieri's epic poem Divine Comedy. The film mixes material from Dante's "Inferno" with plot points from Charles Dickens' A Christmas Carol. The book was filmed earlier in 1911 in Italy as L'Inferno, and Fox later remade the film in 1935, again as Dante's Inferno, starring Spencer Tracy in the lead role.

Plot
The tactics of a vicious slumlord and greedy businessman named Mortimer Judd finally drive a distraught man named Eugene Craig, whom he has forced into bankruptcy, to commit suicide. He constantly refuses requests for charity and treats his bedridden wife very badly. The businessman receives a copy of Dante's Inferno in the mail and reads it. In the story, a floating angel raises its sword and parts a legion of demons to allow Dante to pass, naked sinners burn in boiling tar and suicides are transformed into living trees in a forest in Hell. Judd is plunged into a frightening dream in which he is tried for murder and executed, and is afterward taken by demons to Hell where he will spend the rest of eternity. The nightmare teaches him humility and the importance of extending charity to those less fortunate than himself. He gets the chance to redeem himself by preventing Eugene Craig from committing suicide.

Cast

Production
This film, like several previous Fox Films such as The Queen of Sheba, A Daughter of the Gods and some Theda Bara films, featured full nudity in some sequences. Actress Pauline Starke is completely nude in the Hell sequences, with the exception of a large flowing black wig that covers her nether regions. Some bit players and extras are fully nude. The different prints of the film were more than likely edited according to the attitudes of the different regions or parts of the world they played in. The film also features popular comic actor Bud Jamison in blackface as a butler; he is easily recognizable under the makeup, and his initial appearance has caused some laughter by knowledgeable film buffs at its occasional screenings.

Some hell scene footage from the film was reused in the 1935 film Dante's Inferno.

For his 1980 sci-fi thriller Altered States director Ken Russell intercut borrowed footage from this film with his own digital effects to create a hallucination sequence.

Criticism
Critic Christopher Workman writes "Despite some massive striking sets and a few truly magnificent moments....the repeated red-tinted shots of bodies writhing in flames get old quick. Without much story to shore it up, the film falls flat well before its conclusion.... But (the 1935 version) was even less interesting, with the vision of Hell compressed into a single 10-minute segment."

Preservation
The UCLA Film and Television Archive has an incomplete print, three reels out of a total of five reels. A print of the film reportedly also survives at the Museum of Modern Art. Some of the original prints of this film had the scenes in hell tinted in red.

See also
Nudity in film
Pre-Code Hollywood

References

External links

1924 films
1920s fantasy films
Films based on Inferno (Dante)
1924 horror films
Fox Film films
American silent feature films
American black-and-white films
Films directed by Henry Otto
The Devil in film
Films set in hell
American fantasy films
American horror drama films
Films about landlords
1920s American films
Silent American drama films
Silent horror films
1920s horror drama films